Joan Manuel Adon (born August 12, 1998) is a Dominican professional baseball pitcher for the Washington Nationals of Major League Baseball (MLB). He made his MLB debut in 2021.

Career
Adon signed with the Nationals in 2016 and started his professional career with the Dominican Summer League Nationals in 2017. Adon split the 2018 season between the GCL Nationals and the Auburn Doubledays, going a combined 3–1 with a 4.11 ERA and 40 strikeouts over  innings. He spent the 2019 season with the Hagerstown Suns, going 11–3 with a 3.86 ERA and 90 strikeouts over 105 innings. In 2020, he was named to Washington's 60-man player pool, working out at the alternate training site in Fredericksburg, Virginia, during the coronavirus-shortened MLB season. After the season, the Nationals selected Adon's contract, adding him to their 40-man roster.

Adon split the 2021 minor league season between the Wilmington Blue Rocks, the Harrisburg Senators, and the Rochester Red Wings, going a combined 7–6 with a 4.97 ERA and 122 strikeouts over 105 innings.

On October 3, 2021, Adon was promoted to the active roster to make his MLB debut versus the Boston Red Sox. He pitched into the sixth inning, striking out nine, while giving up two earned runs: a fourth-inning solo homer by Rafael Devers, then a runner bequeathed to reliever Patrick Murphy who came around to score in the sixth. His nine strikeouts were the most by a pitcher making his MLB debut in the 2021 season.

Adon made the rotation to begin the 2022 season, despite only having made five starts above the High-A level. Adon was the first pitcher to record his 10th loss during the season, which happened on June 7 after a start against the Miami Marlins in which he yielded 8 runs in 3 innings pitched, his worst start of the season. After the game, he was optioned to Triple-A Rochester, as Stephen Strasburg came off the injured list on June 9 to take his place in the rotation. At the time, Adon was 1–10 with a 6.95 ERA and 1.76 WHIP in 12 starts, walking 5.66 batters per 9 innings, all league-worst totals among pitchers with at least 50 innings pitched. In addition, his whiff rate was the lowest in the major leagues, as batters made contact on 86.6% of their swings. His one win, his first in the major leagues, came in a start against the Arizona Diamondbacks on April 19, in which he threw 6.1 scoreless innings. Adon was brought back up to the major leagues to start the first game of a double-header against the Philadelphia Phillies on June 17, but after recording his 11th loss, Adon was sent back down to Triple-A the following day.

Pitch types

References

External links

1998 births
Living people
Sportspeople from Santo Domingo
Dominican Republic expatriate baseball players in the United States
Major League Baseball players from the Dominican Republic
Major League Baseball pitchers
Washington Nationals players
Dominican Summer League Nationals players
Gulf Coast Nationals players
Auburn Doubledays players
Hagerstown Suns players
Wilmington Blue Rocks players
Harrisburg Senators players
Rochester Red Wings players